In mathematics, Paley graphs are dense undirected graphs constructed from the members of a suitable finite field by connecting pairs of elements that differ by a quadratic residue. The Paley graphs form an infinite family of conference graphs, which yield an infinite family of symmetric conference matrices. Paley graphs allow graph-theoretic tools to be applied to the number theory of quadratic residues, and have interesting properties that make them useful in graph theory more generally.

Paley graphs are named after Raymond Paley.  They are closely related to the Paley construction for constructing Hadamard matrices from quadratic residues .
Sachs was interested in them for their self-complementarity properties, while Erdős and Rényi studied their symmetries.

Paley digraphs are directed analogs of Paley graphs that yield antisymmetric conference matrices.

Definition 
Let q be a prime power such that q = 1 (mod 4). That is, q should either be an arbitrary power of a Pythagorean prime (a prime congruent to 1 mod 4) or an even power of an odd non-Pythagorean prime. This choice of q implies that in the unique finite field Fq of order q, the element  −1 has a square root.

Now let V = Fq and let

.
If a pair {a,b} is included in E, it is included under either ordering of its two elements. For, a − b = −(b − a), and  −1 is a square, from which it follows that a − b is a square if and only if b − a is a square.

By definition G = (V, E) is the Paley graph of order q.

Example 
For q = 13, the field Fq is just integer arithmetic modulo 13.  The numbers with square roots mod 13 are:
 ±1 (square roots ±1 for +1, ±5 for −1)
 ±3 (square roots ±4 for +3, ±6 for −3)
 ±4 (square roots ±2 for +4, ±3 for −4).
Thus, in the Paley graph, we form a vertex for each of the integers in the range [0,12], and connect each such integer x to six neighbors: x ± 1 (mod 13), x ± 3 (mod 13), and x ± 4 (mod 13).

Properties 
The Paley graphs are self-complementary: the complement of any Paley graph is isomorphic to it.   One isomorphism is via the mapping that takes a vertex x to xk (mod q), where k is any nonresidue mod q .

Paley graphs are strongly regular graphs, with parameters 

This in fact follows from the fact that the graph is arc-transitive and self-complementary.  In addition, Paley graphs form an infinite family of conference graphs.

They can be calculated using the quadratic Gauss sum or by using the theory of strongly regular graphs.

If q is prime, the isoperimetric number i(G) of the Paley graph is known to satisfy the following bounds:

When q is prime, the associated Paley graph is a Hamiltonian circulant graph.

Paley graphs are quasi-random (Chung et al. 1989): the number of times each possible constant-order graph occurs as a subgraph of a Paley graph is (in the limit for large q) the same as for random graphs, and large sets of vertices have approximately the same number of edges as they would in random graphs.

Applications 
 The Paley graph of order 9 is a locally linear graph, a rook's graph, and the graph of the 3-3 duoprism.
 The Paley graph of order 13 has book thickness 4 and queue number 3 .
 The Paley graph of order 17 is the unique largest graph G such that neither G nor its complement contains a complete 4-vertex subgraph (Evans et al. 1981).  It follows that the Ramsey number R(4, 4) = 18.
 The Paley graph of order 101 is currently the largest known graph G such that neither G nor its complement contains a complete 6-vertex subgraph.
 Sasukara et al. (1993) use Paley graphs to generalize the construction of the Horrocks–Mumford bundle.

Paley digraphs
Let q be a prime power such that q = 3 (mod 4). Thus, the finite field of order q, Fq, has no square root of −1.  Consequently, for each pair (a,b) of distinct elements of Fq, either a − b or b − a, but not both, is a square.  The Paley digraph is the directed graph with vertex set V = Fq and arc set 

The Paley digraph is a tournament because each pair of distinct vertices is linked by an arc in one and only one direction.

The Paley digraph leads to the construction of some antisymmetric conference matrices and biplane geometries.

Genus 
The six neighbors of each vertex in the Paley graph of order 13 are connected in a cycle; that is, the graph is locally cyclic. Therefore, this graph can be embedded as a Whitney triangulation of a torus, in which every face is a triangle and every triangle is a face. Specifically, Mohar conjectures that the Paley graphs of square order can be embedded into surfaces with genus

where the o(1) term can be any function of q that goes to zero in the limit as q goes to infinity.

 finds embeddings of the Paley graphs of order q ≡ 1 (mod 8) that are highly symmetric and self-dual, generalizing a natural embedding of the Paley graph of order 9 as a 3×3 square grid on a torus. However the genus of White's embeddings is higher by approximately a factor of three than Mohar's conjectured bound.

References

External links 

Number theory
Parametric families of graphs
Regular graphs
Strongly regular graphs